Didao may refer to:
Didao District (滴道区), in Jixi, Heilongjiang, China
Lintao County, formerly known as Didao (狄道), in Gansu, China
Battle of Didao, between the states of Shu Han and Cao Wei in 255